Josephine Onyia Nnkiruka (born 15 July 1986 in Lagos) is a Nigerian-born Spanish track and field athlete who specializes in the 100 metres hurdles. She represented Spain at the 2008 Beijing Olympics.

She changed nationality from Nigeria to Spain in April 2007, following in the footsteps of another hurdler Glory Alozie. Her first medal as a Spaniard came at the 2007 IAAF World Athletics Final, where she took the hurdles silver medal. She started the following season with a gold medal at the 2008 European Athletics Indoor Cup, but tripped at the last hurdle at the 2008 IAAF World Indoor Championships and finished in last place. Onyia set a Spanish national record at the 2008 IAAF Golden League meet in ISTAF Berlin meeting, recording 12.50 seconds and improving upon her previous best by 14 hundredths of a second. She competed in the hurdles at the Summer Olympics and just missed the final after finishing fifth in the semi-finals. In 2016, she was disqualified from the 2008 Olympics for doping, and her result was annulled after her 2008 sample was re-tested and failed.

She was the gold medalist at the 2008 IAAF World Athletics Final later that season.  However, she tested positive for methylhexaneamine at the 2008 Athletissima meeting and also clenbuterol at the World Athletics Final. Real Federación Española de Atletismo, the Spanish athletics body, decided not to sanction the athlete as she had tested negative twice around the time of the positive clenbuterol test. However, the IAAF intervened and took the case to the Court of Arbitration for Sport (CAS). The CAS upheld the IAAF's appeal and Onyia was suspended for two years and her recent past results were annulled, effectively removing her of all her achievements as a senior athlete. The two separate positive tests were treated as one single breach of the doping rules as she had not been informed of the first until after the second positive test. She received a two-year competitive ban, set to expire on 10 November 2010.

She returned to competition in January 2011, taking an indoor win in Zaragoza. She received a further doping suspension of two years after a failed test for dimethylpentylamine in July 2011.

In August 2015 it was reported that Onyia had tested positive for anabolic steroids at the Spanish athletics championships and that she was pulled from the 2015 World Championships in Athletics and subsequently received a lifetime ban.

Achievements

References

External links
 



Living people
1986 births
Sportspeople from Lagos
Nigerian female hurdlers
Spanish female hurdlers
Olympic athletes of Spain
Athletes (track and field) at the 2008 Summer Olympics
Doping cases in athletics
Nigerian sportspeople in doping cases
Spanish sportspeople in doping cases
Nigerian emigrants to Spain
Naturalised citizens of Spain
Spanish sportspeople of African descent
Spanish people of Nigerian descent
Sportspeople of Nigerian descent